The 2011 R League is reserve league of 2011 K-League. 2011 season was held from March 10 to October 13. In this season, Police FC and all K League club's reserves participate the league, except newly formed Gwangju FC. Each team will be played 21 games in home and away.

League standing

Group League A (GLA)

Group League B (GLB)

Winners

External links
 K-League website

R League seasons
2011 in South Korean football